The Aiguille Verte, which is French for "Green Needle", is a mountain in the Mont Blanc massif in the French Alps.

It was first climbed on 29 June 1865  by Edward Whymper, Christian Almer and Franz Biner, a fortnight before the fateful first ascent of the Matterhorn. Whymper was unable to climb with his usual guide, Michel Croz, who had to wait for a client in Chamonix. As a result, Whymper hired the services of Christian Almer, who had been with Alfred Wills on the Wetterhorn in 1854. Whymper describes the push for the summit:

The second ascent was by Charles Hudson, T. S. Kennedy and Michel Croz via the Moine ridge. The first woman to climb the Aiguille Verte was Lucy Walker in 1870. The first solo ascent of the Arête Sans Nom was accomplished by Nicolas Jaeger in 1972.

Incidents
There have been a number of incidents where climbers have been killed or gone missing during climbing Aiguille Verte. The body of Patrice Hyvert, a French climber who went missing on 1 March 1982, was found on 9 July 2014.

See also

References

External links 
Aiguille Verte on SummitPost.org

Gallery

Alpine four-thousanders
Mountains of the Graian Alps
Mountains of Haute-Savoie
Mont Blanc massif